The buff-bellied warbler (Phyllolais pulchella) is a species of bird in the family Cisticolidae. It is monotypic within the genus Phyllolais. It is found in Cameroon, Central African Republic, Chad, Democratic Republic of the Congo, Eritrea, Ethiopia, Kenya, Nigeria, Rwanda, Sudan, Tanzania, and Uganda, where its natural habitats are subtropical or tropical dry forest, dry savanna, and subtropical or tropical dry shrubland.

It is a small, dull coloured warbler found in savanna and acacia woodland. It particularly favours Acacia xanthophloea and Acacia abyssinica and can often be seen foraging among the branches in pairs or small groups. It is inconspicuous in its habits but can often be seen feeding in mix-species flocks.

References

Ryan, Peter (2006). Family Cisticolidae (Cisticolas and allies). pp. 378–492 in del Hoyo J., Elliott A. & Christie D.A. (2006) Handbook of the Birds of the World. Volume 11. Old World Flycatchers to Old World Warblers'' Lynx Edicions, Barcelona 

buff-bellied warbler
Birds of Sub-Saharan Africa
buff-bellied warbler
Taxonomy articles created by Polbot
buff-bellied warbler